The etch pit density (EPD) is a measure for the quality of semiconductor wafers.

Etching
An etch solution is applied on the surface of the wafer where the etch rate is increased at dislocations of the crystal resulting in pits. For GaAs one uses typically molten KOH at 450 degrees Celsius for about 40 minutes in a zirconium crucible.  The density of the pits can be determined by optical contrast microscopy. Silicon wafers have usually a very low density of < 100 cm−2 while semi-insulating GaAs wafers have a density on the order of 105 cm−2.

Germanium detectors
High-purity Germanium detectors require the Ge crystals to be grown with a controlled range of dislocation density to reduce impurities. The etch pitch density requirement is typically within the range 103 to 104 cm−2.

Standards
The etch pit density can be determined according to DIN 50454-1 and ASTM F 1404.

References

Semiconductors